María Victoria "Mariví" González Laguillo (born 27 February 1961 in Ciudad de México, Distrito Federal) is a former field hockey player from Spain. She was born in Mexico. She was a member of the Women's National Team that surprisingly won the golden medal at the 1992 Summer Olympics on home soil (Barcelona). She also competed in the 1996 Summer Olympics in Atlanta, Georgia.

External links
 
 

1961 births
Living people
Spanish female field hockey players
Female field hockey goalkeepers
Olympic field hockey players of Spain
Field hockey players at the 1992 Summer Olympics
Field hockey players at the 1996 Summer Olympics
Olympic gold medalists for Spain
Sportspeople from Mexico City
Medalists at the 1992 Summer Olympics
Olympic medalists in field hockey
20th-century Spanish women